Yasmin Isabel "Yassi" Pressman(born 11 May 1995) is a Filipino-British model, actress, television personality, singer, and dancer. As a power dancer, she was given a break in her career for portraying antagonist roles before rising to prominence after portraying Alyana Arevalo in the hit FPJ's Ang Probinsyano.

Early life
Pressman was born in British Hong Kong to a British father and a Filipino mother from Isabela. Her second name, Isabel, is a reference to her mother's home province. Pressman has four sisters: Abby, Cara, Siobhan and Issa.

Career
Best known for her breakthrough role in Ang Probinsyano as Alyana R. Arevalo-Dalisay, Yassi has made a mark in Philippine showbusiness not only as a versatile actress, but as a gifted singer and dancer. Yassi can regularly be seen not only in TV series but on variety shows, blockbuster movies and multiple product endorsement ads.

She started appearing in TV commercials at the age of 6, her first being Colgate in 2001.

In 2006, she was cast in the ABS-CBN drama series Gulong ng Palad as the young Luisa.

In 2009, she became a regular GMA Network talent as one of the female dancers of SOP. Pressman was known as the "Princess of the Dance Floor" of Party Pilipinas. When SOP was replaced by Party Pilipinas, Pressman became a part of Sayaw Pilipinas.

In 2013, she signed a co-management contract with Viva Artists Agency. Yassi was also one of the top VJs at MTV and appeared in many online shorts.

In 2014, she was cast as Lorraine "Lory" Keet in the film Diary ng Panget with Andre Paras as her on-screen partner. Pressman also starred as Audrey Dela Cruz in the film Talk Back, and You're Dead with Nadine Lustre and James Reid.

In 2016, Pressman transferred to ABS-CBN as a housemate in Pinoy Big Brother: Lucky 7. She also became a regular performer in ASAP and joined the longest running teleserye on Philippine television, the teleserye adaptation of FPJ's Ang Probinsyano.

Personal life 
Yassi is very socially aware and holds multiple charity projects every time she celebrates birthdays and holidays.

On February 6, 2020, Yassi's father, Ronnie, died at the age of 90 due to various complications from old age.

In July 2022, Pressman admitted her relationship with businessman Jon Semira.

Filmography

Television

Film

Discography

Albums

Singles

Publications

Awards and recognitions
Pressman has been recognized multiple times by the most prestigious and honourable award giving body in the Philippines. She has won three Guillermo Mendoza Memorial Awards for Best TV Supporting TV Actress for three straight years (2018-2020).

Notes

References

External links
 

1995 births
Living people
ABS-CBN personalities
GMA Network personalities
Filipino child actresses
VJs (media personalities)
21st-century Filipino actresses
Filipino people of British descent
Actresses from Manila
Star Magic
Pinoy Big Brother contestants
Filipino female dancers
Filipino female models
Filipino women pop singers
British female models
Filipina gravure idols
People from British Hong Kong
Singers from Manila
TV5 (Philippine TV network) personalities
Viva Artists Agency
Viva Records (Philippines) artists